HC Kometa Brno ("Comet" in English) is a professional ice hockey team based in Brno, Czech Republic. They play in the Czech Extraliga. Kometa is the most successful ice hockey club in the Czech Republic with 13 Czechoslovak (and Czech) league championship titles. Holding three European Cup titles, Kometa ranks as the most successful Czech club in international ice hockey. The team HC Kometa Brno has won two Czech championships seasons, capturing the title in both 2016–2017 and in 2017–2018.

History 

The club was founded in 1953 as an army ice hockey club with the name Rudá hvězda Brno ("Red Star"). The majority of players were transferred from two hockey clubs in Brno (TJ Spartak Brno Zbrojovka and TJ Spartak GZ Královo Pole). In 1962, the club changed its name to ZKL Brno (ZKL is an abbreviation of "Ball Bearing Factory") and stopped being an army team. In 1976, the name was changed to Zetor Brno. Shortly after the revolution (1994), the club changed its name to HC Kometa Brno. "Kometa" was the team's nickname since the 1950s (as opposed to the official "Red Star") and the team was commonly referred to by this name since its beginning.

In 1996, the team was relegated from Czech Extraliga to the second highest ice hockey league, the 1st Czech Republic Hockey League. For many years, the team struggled due to poor financing and multiple changes of owners, facing relegation again in 2001–2002. The club almost ceased to exist, playing in the East division of the third-highest Czech ice hockey league. By the 2003–2004 season, it returned to the first league. In 2004, Kometa played its first playoff series since 1997, reached the semifinals in 2008, and reached the finals in 2009.

On 1 April 2009, Kometa bought the licence for another South Moravian club, HC Znojemští Orli. This club began to serve as a farm team for Brno.

In March 2012, the team managed to defeat HC Sparta Praha, the winner of the 2011–12 Czech Extraliga regular season, in six games, qualifying for the playoff semifinals. In the semifinals, they defeated HC Plzeň 1929, the runner-up of the regular season, in five games. In the final, Kometa lost the Czech Extraliga championship final to HC Pardubice in six games.

Honours

Domestic

Czech Extraliga
  Winners (2): 2016–17, 2017–18
  Runners-up (2): 2011–12, 2013–14
  3rd place (1): 2014–15

Czech 1. Liga
  Winners (1): 1994–95
  Runners-up (1): 2008–09
  3rd place (1): 1993–94

Czechoslovak Extraliga
  Winners (11): 1954–55, 1955–56, 1956–57, 1957–58, 1959–60, 1960–61, 1961–62, 1962–63, 1963–64, 1964–65, 1965–66
  Runners-up (4): 1953–54, 1967–68, 1968–69, 1970–71
  3rd place (3): 1958–59, 1966–67, 1969–70

1st. Czech National Hockey League
  Winners (3): 1980–81, 1988–89, 1990–91
  3rd place (1): 1992–93

International
IIHF European Cup
  Winners (3): 1965–66, 1966–67, 1967–68

Pre-season
Spengler Cup
  Winners (1): 1955
  Runners-up (1): 1957

Rona Cup
  Winners (1): 2014

Tipsport Hockey Cup
  Winners (1): 2008

History of the team name
 1953 – Rudá hvězda Brno
 1962 – TJ ZKL Brno
 1976 – TJ Zetor Brno
 1990 – HC Zetor Brno
 1993 – HC Královopolská Brno
 1994 – HC Kometa Brno
 1995 – HC Kometa Brno BVV
 1997 – HC Kometa Brno

Players

Current roster

Gallery

Notes

External links 

 Official website
 Modrobílí - HC Kometa Brno fans
 HC Kometa Brno - Facebook

Brno
Brno
Sport in Brno
Ice hockey clubs established in 1953
1953 establishments in Czechoslovakia